The Embassy of the Kingdom of Denmark in Kyiv (Danish: Danmarks ambassade i Kiev) is the diplomatic mission of Denmark in Ukraine.

History 
Following independence, Ukraine August 24, 1991 Denmark recognized Ukraine December 31, 1991. February 12, 1992 between Ukraine and Denmark was established diplomatic relations. Danish Ambassadors to Georgia are also based in Kyiv. As a result of the 2022 Russian invasion of Ukraine, the embassy was closed on 22 February 2022 and reopened again on 2 May 2022.

Previous Ambassadors
 Christian Faber-Rod (1992–1997)
 Jorn Krogbeck (1997–2001)
 Martin Kofod (2001–2002)
 Christian Faber-Rod (2002–2005)
 Uffe Andersson Balslev (2005–2009)
 Michael Borg-Hansen (2009–2013) 
 Merete Juhl (2013–2017)
 Ruben Madsen (2017–2020)
 Ole Egberg Mikkelsen (2020–)

See also 
 Denmark-Ukraine relations
 Foreign relations of Denmark
 Foreign relations of Ukraine
 Embassy of Ukraine, Copenhagen
 Diplomatic missions in Ukraine
 Diplomatic missions of Denmark

References

External links 
 Embassy of Denmark in Kyiv
 Ministry of Foreign Affairs of Ukraine 

Diplomatic missions in Kyiv
Kiev
Denmark–Ukraine relations